The Yagur Junction bombing was a suicide bombing which occurred on April 10, 2002 on an Egged commuter bus line number 960 which was passing through Yagur Junction in northern Israel. 8 people were killed in the attack and 19 people were injured.

The attack
On Wednesday, around 7:15 am April 10, 2002, a Palestinian militant exploded himself on Egged bus no. 960 which was on its way from Haifa to Jerusalem. The explosion occurred while the bus was passing near Kibbutz Yagur. The Israeli police estimation was that the suicide bomber boarded the bus at its first stop in Haifa and detonated the bomb after only five kilometers.

Eight people were killed in the attack and 19 others were injured, three of them seriously. Most of the injured were Israeli soldiers and policemen. The force of the blast also damaged many vehicles in nearby proximity.

The perpetrators 
The Palestinian Islamist militant organization Hamas claimed responsibility for the attack and stated that the suicide bomber was a Palestinian from Jenin named Iman al-Hijah.

References

External links 
 MIDEAST TURMOIL: HAIFA; New Suicide Raid Casts Doubt on Israeli Strategy - posted on the New York Times on April 11, 2002
 Israeli Bus Bomber Kills 8 - posted on the WSB-TV on April 10, 2002

Mass murder in 2002
Hamas suicide bombings of buses
Egged Bus 823 Bombing
April 2002 events in Asia
Islamic terrorism in Israel